Elasmia insularis is a species of moth of the family Notodontidae. It is found in Cuba. It has been recorded from Texas, but these are probably misidentifications and the species is not thought to be present in the United States.

References

Moths described in 1866
Notodontidae
Endemic fauna of Cuba